"Worthy / Lift Me from the Ground" (stylized in lowercase) is a dual-single by the Dutch musician San Holo, released on August 2, 2018 as the first and second single from his debut album, Album1.

Background and release 
"Worthy" was one of the first songs that Holo wrote with Album1 in mind. The lyrics of the song were inspired by a conversation he had with his ex-girlfriend. The artist said that, after a long process, he had finally found a way to incorporate his guitar playing style into his electronic music. "Lift Me from the Ground" started out as a "little melody", also on guitar. He stated that, at the time he wrote the melody, he knew it would be "the heart of the song". Holo wrote its lyrics with The Nicholas. Initially, Holo would sing the vocals, but he said he "didn't like it". He then decided to use Sofie Winterson's vocals. Both songs were released as a double single on August 2, 2018. He explained that he decided to release both songs together because "they are true companions". "Lift Me from the Ground" featured in the Netflix film To All the Boys: P.S. I Still Love You (2020).

Tracklist 
Source:
 Worthy — 4:59
 Lift Me from the Ground  — 4:20

Charts

References 

Discography

2018 singles
2018 songs